Moringua edwardsi, the common spaghetti eel, is an eel in the family Moringuidae (spaghetti/worm eels). It was described by David Starr Jordan and Charles Harvey Bollman in 1889, originally under the genus Stilbiscus. It is a subtropical, marine eel known from the western Atlantic Ocean, including Antigua and Barbuda, Aruba, the Bahamas, Barbados, Belize, Bermuda, Cuba, Dominica, Grenada, Guadeloupe, Honduras, Jamaica, Martinique, Mexico, Montserrat, Nicaragua, Puerto Rico, Saint Kitts and Nevis, Saint Lucia, Saint Vincent and the Grenadines, Trinidad and Tobago, Florida, Venezuela, the Virgin Islands, British, and the Virgin Islands of the United States. Males can reach a maximum total length of 15 cm, while females can reach a maximum of 50 cm. The eels feed primarily off of burrowing invertebrates.

Due to its wide distribution and lack of known threats, the IUCN redlist currently lists M. edwardsi as Least Concern.

References

Moringuidae
Fauna of Bermuda
Fish of the Caribbean
Vertebrates of Guadeloupe
Fish described in 1889
Taxa named by David Starr Jordan
Taxa named by Charles Harvey Bollman